Bespokoyny was a  of the Soviet Navy which later transferred to the Indonesian Navy and renamed RI Sandjaja (203).

Development 

The development of the first post-war destroyer project based on the previous project 30 was entrusted to the TsKB-17 team. The composition of the armament was finally specified on November 28, 1945. The technical design materials and working drawings were developed under the leadership of the chief designer A. L. Fisher (deputies G. D. Agul, K. A. Maslennikov) in the new, recreated, TsKB-53. The technical design was approved by the Decree of the Council of Ministers of the USSR No. 149-95 of January 28, 1947.

The lead ship of this project was accepted into the USSR Navy on December 21, 1949, on the occasion of J.V. Stalin's birthday. Engineer-Lieutenant Colonel A.T.

Construction and career
The ship was built at Mykolayiv Shipyard in Nikolaev and was launched on 30 March 1951 and commissioned into the Black Sea Fleet on 11 November 1951.

She was decommissioned on 30 June 1959 and sold to the Indonesian Navy. She was renamed RI Sandjaja (203).

She was again retired from service in 1971.

References

Ships built at Shipyard named after 61 Communards
Skoryy-class destroyers
1951 ships
Ships of the Indonesian Navy